Daniela De Martino is an Australian politician who is the current member for the district of Monbulk in the Victorian Legislative Assembly. She is a member of the Labor Party and was elected in the 2022 state election, replacing retiring MLA James Merlino, achieving a 1.3% swing in her favour.

De Martino is the daughter and granddaughter of Italian immigrants. She has worked as a secondary teacher and has operated her own small business.

References 

Year of birth missing (living people)
Living people
Members of the Victorian Legislative Assembly
21st-century Australian politicians
21st-century Australian women politicians
Australian Labor Party members of the Parliament of Victoria
Women members of the Victorian Legislative Assembly
Australian politicians of Italian descent